Freshwater (formerly, Wrangletown, Garfield, Lambertville, and Hardscrabble) is an unincorporated community in Humboldt County, California. The area is the site of a now logged massive old-growth redwood forest and prevalent remaining second-growth forest. The trees in the area are storied to have been some of the largest coast redwoods to have ever existed. On September 24, 1964, the large area and all its residents became part of unincorporated Eureka, within the 95503 zipcode. Freshwater Park, a Humboldt County Park, which has picnic areas and a swimming area each summer, is located nearby on Freshwater Creek.

Education
Freshwater is the site of the Freshwater Elementary School District, and home of the Freshwater School, a public K-6 school, and Freshwater Charter Middle School for seventh and eighth grade students. The original school was a one-room schoolhouse. In the 1920s, a two-room brick and mortar school was built. A new school was built in 1952 and has been renovated and expanded several times since.

The actual original town site of Freshwater is the site of Garfield Elementary School District, which operates a small K-6 public school.

Both school districts in the area known as "Freshwater" are also within the Eureka Unified High School District, and students usually attend Eureka High School following successful completion of primary education.

See also

References

Eureka, California
Unincorporated communities in Humboldt County, California
Unincorporated communities in California